Park Min-hyuk (born February 25, 1999), well known as Rocky, is a South Korean dancer, rapper, singer, actor, and composer. Rocky debuted as a member of South Korean boy group Astro in 2016. Apart from his group's activities, Rocky has also starred in various drama series such as  Soul Plate (2019),  Find Me If You Can (2021),  Hyangjeon of Youth (2021) and Broke Rookie Star (2022). Additionally, he also cast in musical drama The Three Musketeers (2022).

On February 28, 2023, following the contract discussion since late December 2022, it was confirmed that Rocky decided to not renew his contract with Fantagio and departed from Astro.

Early life 
Rocky was born on February 25, 1999, in Jinju, South Gyeongsang Province, South Korea. He attended and graduated from Hanlim Multi Art School with a focus on Practical Music.

He has a younger brother, Jeonggeun, who is a member of the boy group Haww under Biscuit Entertainment.

Career

2010–2015: Pre debut 
In 2010 in the fifth grade of elementary school, Rocky participated in the audition for the musical Billy Elliot.  In the same year, he became trainee under Fantagio Music.

Rocky had been a contestant of Korea's Got Talent in 2011.

Rocky was the first trainee who has been introduced into i-Teen project, Lotte World Rising Start Concert.

Before their debut, Rocky along with the other 5 members of Astro starred in a web-series To Be Continued.

2016–2021: Debut with Astro and solo activities 

Rocky debuted as part of the six-member boy group Astro on February 23, 2016, as a dancer and rapper of the group.

On August 24, 2016, Rocky appeared in an episode of Mnet's Hit the Stage where he portrayed The Mask. Rocky received praise from the judges, noting his expressions and movements as a perfect portrayal of the character.

On November 5, 2018, after four rounds of battle in 1theK's Dance War, Rocky was revealed to be Purple23 and placed second in the dance battle competition. On November 30, 2018, Fantagio Music released the digital single "STAR" which is a collaboration between Rocky and singer-songwriter Chawoo. "STAR" was later included in the FM201.8-11Hz which was released on December 13, 2018.

During Astro's second Astroad to Seoul "Starlight" concert which was held on December 22–23, 2018, Rocky performed his first solo song "Have a Good Day". It was included in the DVD of the concert which was released in June 2019. In 2019, Rocky self-composed one of the tracks from Astro's sixth EP, Blue Flame, titled "When the Wind Blows".

Rocky was also one of the composers for the group's special single "No I don’t" which was released in June 2020.  On June 24, 2020, Rocky was announced to be the solo MC for the Chinese Korean Wave Program Idol Coming to Work. The show promotes the Hallyu wave to China-wide market.  On September 29, 2020, Rocky's first OST entitled "Shiny Blue" was released for the web series Dok Go Bin Is Updating.

On April 5, 2021, his composition entitled "Our Spring" was released as a track in Astro's second full studio album — All Yours.  Rocky appeared as a competitor named 'Undutiful Child Cries' in MBC King of Mask Singer on its 305th and 306th episode which aired on May 2 and May 9, 2021, respectively. 

On May 23, 2021, Rocky's self-produced music video for "Our Spring" was released. Rocky participated from raw video footage collection to post-production of the aforementioned music video. Rocky was credited as a lyricist and composer for "7Days Tension" — a promotional single by the girl group Weeekly which was released on May 28, 2021, for the eyewear brand Davich.

On October 14, 2021, Fantagio confirmed that Rocky was cast in the web drama Hyangjeon of Youth, based on the South Korean classic literature 'The Story of Chunhyang'. Rocky will play a modern version of Lee Mongryong.  On October 28, 2021, Rocky was announced as part of G-Market's mystery romance thriller web drama called Find Me If You Can. He played the role of a superstar named Choi Jeong-sang. The web drama premiered on November 9, 2021, via INSSA OPPA G YouTube Channel. 

On December 10, 2021, Fantagio confirmed that Rocky has been cast in the web drama Salty Idol where he will take on the main role of Hwiyeon — A solo singer who joins the Idol group 'X-PIERS'.  On December 27, 2021, Fantagio confirmed that Rocky and band-mate Jinjin will form Astro’s second sub-unit called Jinjin & Rocky. They debuted with the extended play Restore on January 17, 2022.

2022–present: Sub-unit debut, solo activities and departure from Astro 
On January 17, Rocky debuted as part of the duo Jinjin & Rocky with the EP Restore.

On March 28, it was reported that Rocky would sing the national anthem for the opening games of the 22nd Season of the KBO League happening on April 2, 2022, at the Changwon NC Park.

On May 16, Rocky's solo ballad song "S#1" was released as part of Astro's third full studio album  — Drive to the Starry Road. 

Rocky's second OST entitled "Over That" was released for the web drama Broke Rookie Star which he also starred as "Whee-yeon", a solo singer who joined a rising idol group called X-PIERS.

On May 29, G-Market released a teaser for its new web series called X:SSG on which Rocky will play the role of "Woo-ju" together with his band mate Jinjin, Monsta X Hyungwon, Minhyuk, Joohoney, AB6IX Daehwi, Jeon Woong, and Apink Yoon Bo-mi. The web series was released on G-Market's Youtube Channel on June 5, 2022. 

Rocky will play the role of D'Artagnan in the Korean remake of the musical The Three Musketeers. The show will run starting September 16, 2022, at the Universal Art Center in Seoul.

On August 20, Rocky won his first Best Actor award for the web series Broke Rookie Star in the international web festival Seoul Webfest 2022. On November 6, Rocky won his second Best Actor award for the same web series at the LA Webfest 2022, the largest film festival for web dramas in the world. Broke Rookie Star also won Best Web Series of All Genres award. According to the executive chairman of the festival organization committee, this is the first time for a Korean web series to bag the grand prize at the film festival since its launch in 2009. On December 30, 2022, Rocky won his third Best Actor award at the 6th Asia Web Awards 2022 for his lead role in Broke Rookie Star.

Rocky participated in writing, composing, and choreographing one of HAWW's debut song called "Wanna Be Love" which was released on February 23, 2023.

On February 28, 2023, the agency confirmed that Rocky decided not to renew his contract and left the band.

Personal life 
On October 31, 2022, the agency confirmed that Rocky is in a relationship with actress Park Bo-yeon. However, Park's agency dismissed the rumors as false earlier the same day, saying, "We confirmed with actor Park that the two are good colleagues ever since working together on Find Me if You Can last year."

Discography

Singles

Composition credits
All credits are listed under the Korea Music Copyright Association unless otherwise stated.

Filmography

Television series

Web series

Television shows

Web shows

Theater

Awards and nominations

Notes

References

External links 

  

1999 births
Living people
People from Jinju
South Korean male idols
South Korean male television actors
K-pop singers
Astro (South Korean band) members
21st-century South Korean male singers
Hanlim Multi Art School alumni
South Korean male taekwondo practitioners
Fantagio artists
South Korean male rappers
21st-century rappers